Colfax Township is a township in Pocahontas County, Iowa, USA.

History
Colfax Township was established in 1871. It is named for Schuyler Colfax.

References

Townships in Pocahontas County, Iowa
Townships in Iowa